The 1998 Crown Prince Cup was the 23rd season of the Saudi premier football knockout tournament since its establishment in 1957. The main competition started on 31 January and concluded with the final on 11 March 1998.

Al-Ittihad were the defending champions; however, they were eliminated in the Round of 16 by Al-Shabab.

In the final, Al-Ahli defeated Al-Riyadh 3–2 with a golden goal during extra time to secure their third title and first since 1970. The final was held at the King Fahd International Stadium in Riyadh. As winners of the tournament, Al-Ahli qualified for the 1999–2000 Asian Cup Winners' Cup. As runners-up, Al-Riyadh qualified for the 1999 Arab Cup Winners' Cup.

Qualifying rounds
All of the competing teams that are not members of the Premier League competed in the qualifying rounds to secure one of 4 available places in the Round of 16. First Division sides Al-Raed and Hajer and Second Division sides Al-Akhdoud and Al-Orobah qualified.

Bracket

Round of 16
The draw for the Round of 16 was held on 10 January 1998. The Round of 16 fixtures were played on 31 January and 15, 16, 17, 21 and 25 February 1998. All times are local, AST (UTC+3). Al-Hilal's match was moved to 31 January due to their participation in the 1998 Gulf Club Champions Cup. Al-Shoulla's match was delayed to 20 February due to their postponed league match against Al-Nassr being played on 15 February. Al-Nassr's match was delayed to 25 February due to their participation in the quarter-finals of the 1997–98 Asian Cup Winners' Cup.

Quarter-finals
The draw for the Quarter-finals was held on 19 February 1998. The Quarter-finals fixtures were played on 26 & 27 February and 1 & 3 March 1998. All times are local, AST (UTC+3). Al-Hilal's match was delayed to 3 March due to their participation in the quarter-finals of the 1997–98 Asian Club Championship.

Semi-finals
The draw for the Semi-finals was held on 1 March 1998. The Semi-finals fixtures were played on 5 & 6 March 1998. All times are local, AST (UTC+3).

Final
The 1998 Crown Prince Cup Final was played on 11 March 1998 at the King Fahd International Stadium in Riyadh between Al-Ahli and Al-Riyadh. This was the third Crown Prince Cup final to be held at the stadium. This was Al-Ahli's fifth final and Al-Riyadh's third final. This was a repeat of the 1978 King Cup final. All times are local, AST (UTC+3).

Top goalscorers

References

External links
 Football competitions in Saudi Arabia 1997/98
 goalzz

Saudi Crown Prince Cup seasons
1998 domestic association football cups
Crown Prince Cup